The Journal of Surgical Oncology is a monthly peer-reviewed medical journal covering surgical oncology. It was established in 1969 and is published by Wiley-Liss. The editor-in-chief is Stephen F. Sener (Keck School of Medicine of USC). According to the Journal Citation Reports, the journal has a 2020 impact factor of 3.454, ranking it 157th out of 243 journals in the category "Oncology" and 60th out of 212 journals in the category "Surgery".

References

External links

Wiley-Liss academic journals
Publications established in 1969
Monthly journals
Surgical oncology
Surgery journals
Oncology journals
English-language journals